The 1999 Cape Verdean Football Championship season was the 20th of the competition of the first-tier football in Cape Verde.  The tournament was organized by the Cape Verdean Football Federation.  GD Amarantes won their first and only title.  Sporting Clube da Praia would be the only time that a non-winning title would participate in the 2000 CAF Champions League, the criteria for qualification was not continued.  No club took part in the 2000 CAF Winners' Cup.

Overview
CS Mindelense was the defending team of the title.  A total of 8 clubs participated in the competition, one from each island league, no club came from Santiago Island as the competition was cancelled for the season.  The season had 6 matches in Group A but a shorter 2 and 3 matches in Group B, it was the first ever season with twice the meetings with each club of the group, occurred in only one croup, the next time it was done was in 2017 with the club and the first in each of the three groups.

The league was contested by 8 teams with GD Amarantes winning the championship.  New records were made, Amarantes finished with a new record with 13 points since the points per win risen to three in the nation, Juventude got 10 points, at the time, it became the second highest point in the championships. Two years later, the highest point record was superseded by Onze Unidos.  In goal numbers, Solpontense scored the most with 14 and was a record at the national championships, it was superseded in 2001 by Botafogo.

It marked the last appearance of GD Amarantes at the top-level competition.

Participants

 Académica Operária, winner of the Boa Vista Island League
 Nô Pintcha, winner of the Brava Island League
 Vulcânicos FC, winner of the Fogo Island League
 Onze Unidos, winner of the Maio Island League
 Juventude, winner of the Sal Island League
 Solpontense Futebol Clube, winner of the Santo Antão Island League
 FC Ultramarina, winner of the São Nicolau Island League
 GD Amarantes, winner of the São Vicente Island League

Information about the clubs

League standings

Group A

Group B

Finals

Footnotes

External links
https://web.archive.org/web/20150924011016/http://www.fcf.cv/pt/
Historic results and rankings at rsssf.com

Cape Verdean Football Championship seasons
Cape
1